Ak-Beyit Pass is a pass, elevation , that links At-Bashy Valley and Arpa Valley in Naryn Region of Kyrgyzstan. The road from Bishkek to Torugart (European route E125) runs over the pass.

References

Mountain passes of Kyrgyzstan